Vasopressin receptor 2 (V2R), or arginine vasopressin receptor 2 (officially called AVPR2), is a protein that acts as receptor for vasopressin.  AVPR2 belongs to the subfamily of G-protein-coupled receptors. Its activity is mediated by the Gs type of G proteins, which stimulate adenylate cyclase.

AVPR2 is expressed in the kidney tubule, predominantly in the membrane of cells of the distal convoluted tubule and collecting ducts, in fetal lung tissue and lung cancer, the last two being associated with alternative splicing. AVPR2 is also expressed outside the kidney in vascular endothelium. Stimulation causes the release of von Willebrand factor and factor VIII from the endothelial cells. Because von Willebrand factor helps stabilize circulating levels of factor VIII, the vasopressin analog desmopressin can be used to stimulate the AVPR2 receptor and increase levels of circulating factor VIII. This is useful in the treatment of hemophilia A as well as Von Willebrand disease.

In the kidney, AVPR2's primary property is to respond to arginine vasopressin by stimulating mechanisms that concentrate the urine and maintain water homeostasis in the organism. When the function of AVPR2 is lost, the disease nephrogenic diabetes insipidus (NDI) results.

Antagonists

Vasopressin receptor antagonists that are selective for the V2 receptor include:
 Tolvaptan (FDA-approved)
 Lixivaptan
 Mozavaptan
 Satavaptan

Their main uses are in hyponatremia, such as that caused by syndrome of inappropriate antidiuretic hormone (SIADH) and heart failure, however these agents should be avoided in patients with cirrhosis.

Demeclocycline and lithium carbonate act as indirect antagonists of renal vasopressin V2 receptors by inhibiting activation of the second messenger cascade of the receptors.

Pharmacoperones
Vasopressin receptor 2 function has been shown to be deleteriously effected by point mutations in its gene. Some of these mutations, when expressed, cause the receptor to remain in the cytosol. An approach to rescue receptor function utilizes pharmacoperones or molecular chaperones, which are typically small molecules that rescue misfolded proteins to the cell surface. These interact with the receptor to restore cognate receptor function devoid of antagonist or agonist activity. This approach, when effective, should increase therapeutic reach. Pharmacoperones have been identified that restore function of V2R.

Interactions 

Arginine vasopressin receptor 2 has been shown to interact with C1QTNF1.

References

Further reading

External links 
  GeneReviews/NCBI/NIH/UW entry on Nephrogenic Diabetes Insipidus 

 
 

G protein-coupled receptors